Ardistomis is a genus of pedunculate ground beetles in the family Carabidae. There are more than 40 described species in Ardistomis, in North, Central, and South America.

Species
These 49 species belong to the genus Ardistomis:

 Ardistomis alticola Darlington, 1936  (Hispaniola)
 Ardistomis annona Putzeys, 1846  (French Guiana)
 Ardistomis arechavaletae Putzeys, 1867  (South America)
 Ardistomis aschnae Makhan, 2010  (Surinam)
 Ardistomis atripennis Putzeys, 1867  (the Lesser Antilles)
 Ardistomis batesi Putzeys, 1867  (South America)
 Ardistomis brevis Putzeys, 1867  (Brazil and Ecuador)
 Ardistomis bulirschi Valdes, 2009  (Ecuador)
 Ardistomis constricta Putzeys, 1846  (Brazil)
 Ardistomis convexa Putzeys, 1867  (Mexico and Central America)
 Ardistomis dostali Valdes, 2009  (Central America)
 Ardistomis drumonti Valdes, 2009  (French Guiana)
 Ardistomis dubia Putzeys, 1846  (Colombia)
 Ardistomis dyschirioides Putzeys, 1846  (Colombia and Panama)
 Ardistomis educta Bates, 1881  (Mexico and Central America)
 Ardistomis elongatula Putzeys, 1867  (Cuba)
 Ardistomis fasciolata Putzeys, 1846  (Brazil)
 Ardistomis ferreirai Balkenohl & Pellegrini & Almeida Zampaulo, 2018  (Brazil)
 Ardistomis franki Nichols, 1988  (the Lesser Antilles)
 Ardistomis guadeloupensis Kult, 1950  (the Lesser Antilles)
 Ardistomis haemorrhoa Putzeys, 1867  (Brazil and Peru)
 Ardistomis hispaniolensis Nichols, 1988  (Hispaniola and the Lesser Antilles)
 Ardistomis leprieurii (Chaudoir, 1843)  (South America)
 Ardistomis lindrothi Kult, 1950  (Bolivia and Brazil)
 Ardistomis mannerheimi Putzeys, 1846  (the Caribbean, Mexico, Central America)
 Ardistomis marquardti Kult, 1950  (Brazil)
 Ardistomis minuta Valdes, 2009
 Ardistomis muelleri Kult, 1950  (Mexico)
 Ardistomis nigroclara Darlington, 1939  (Hispaniola)
 Ardistomis nitidipennis Darlington, 1934  (Cuba)
 Ardistomis obliquata Putzeys, 1846  (North America)
 Ardistomis ogloblini Kult, 1950  (Brazil)
 Ardistomis onorei Valdes, 2009
 Ardistomis ovata Putzeys, 1846  (Colombia)
 Ardistomis oxygnatha (Chaudoir, 1843)  (Brazil and French Guiana)
 Ardistomis posticalis Putzeys, 1867  (Brazil)
 Ardistomis profundestriata Putzeys, 1867  (Brazil)
 Ardistomis quadripunctata Kult, 1950  (Brazil)
 Ardistomis quixotei Valdes, 2007
 Ardistomis ramsdeni Darlington, 1937  (Cuba)
 Ardistomis rotundipennis Putzeys, 1867
 Ardistomis rufoclara Darlington, 1939  (Hispaniola)
 Ardistomis samyni Valdes, 2009
 Ardistomis schaumii LeConte, 1857  (Central and North America)
 Ardistomis seriepunctata (Brullé, 1843)  (Brazil, Colombia, and Panama)
 Ardistomis tropicalis Putzeys, 1846  (French Guiana)
 Ardistomis unicolor Putzeys, 1846  (French Guiana)
 Ardistomis venustula Putzeys, 1867  (Brazil and Surinam)
 Ardistomis vergelae Valdes, 2009

References

Scaritinae